Miss Venezuela 1960 was the seventh edition of Miss Venezuela pageant held at Tamanaco Intercontinental Hotel in Caracas, Venezuela, on July 30, 1960. The winner of the pageant was Gladys "Laly" Ascanio Arredondo, (Miss Distrito Federal), who competed in the first edition of Miss International and placed in the semifinalists.

Results
Miss Venezuela 1960 - Gladys Ascanio (Miss Distrito Federal)
1st runner-up - Magaly Burguera (Miss Mérida)
2nd runner-up - Marina Carrero (Miss Táchira)
3rd runner-up - Miriam Estévez (Miss Caracas)
4th runner-up - Aura Rodríguez (Miss Departamento Vargas)
5th runner-up - Gladys Tapia (Miss Barinas)

Delegates

 Miss Amazonas - Carmen Alicia (Chumico) Romero
 Miss Aragua - Milena Cott
 Miss Barinas - Gladys Tapia Angulo
 Miss Bolívar - Roraima Gómez López
 Miss Caracas - Miriam Estévez Acevedo
 Miss Departamento Libertador - Gloria Josefina Altuve
 Miss Departamento Vargas - Aura Rodríguez Acosta
 Miss Distrito Federal - Gladys Ascanio Arredondo
 Miss Mérida - Magaly Burguera Sardi
 Miss Miranda - Rosa Violeta González
 Miss Nueva Esparta - Mélida Ortiz
 Miss Sucre - Omaira Rodríguez
 Miss Táchira - Marina Carrero
 Miss Yaracuy - Elvia Sánchez Parra

External links
Miss Venezuela official website

1960 beauty pageants
1960 in Venezuela